Robert David Thompson (born 27 July 1996) is a British racing driver who currently competes in the British Touring Car Championship driving for Autobrite Direct with JourneyHero. He was the 2022 Jack Sears Trophy winner.

Racing record

Karting career summary

Racing career summary 

† As Thompson was a guest driver, he was ineligible for championship points.

Complete British Touring Car Championship results
(key) (Races in bold indicate pole position – 1 point awarded just in first race; races in italics indicate fastest lap – 1 point awarded all races; * signifies that driver led race for at least one lap – 1 point given all races)

References

External links

1996 births
Living people
British Touring Car Championship drivers
English racing drivers
British racing drivers
Mini Challenge UK drivers
24H Series drivers